New Zealand won 1 medal at the 1988 Winter Paralympics: 0 golds, 1 silver and 0 bronze medals.

See also
 New Zealand at the Paralympics

References

External links
 International Paralympic Committee
 Paralympics New Zealand

Nations at the 1988 Winter Paralympics
1988
Paralympics